Palanpur–Bhuj Intercity Express is an Express train belonging to Western Railway zone that runs between  and  in India. It is currently being operated with 19151/19152 train numbers on a daily basis. W.e.f 15-08-2018, It has been extended up to Bhuj based on demand of passenger.

Service

19151/Palanpur–Bhuj Intercity Express has an average speed of 46 km/hr and covers 359 km in 7h 50m.
19152/Bhuj–Palanpur Intercity Express has an average speed of 45 km/hr and covers 359 km in 8h.

Route 

19151/52 Palanpur–Bhuj 

Coach composition

The train has standard ICF rakes with max speed of 110 kmph. The train consists of 12 coaches:

 10 General Unreserved
 2 Seating cum Luggage Rake

Traction

Both trains are hauled by a Vatva Loco Shed/Ratlam Loco Shed diesel WDM-3A locomotive  from Palanpur to Bhuj and vice versa.

Rake sharing

The train shares its rake with 59425/59426 Gandhidham–Palanpur Passenger.

See also 

 Palanpur Junction railway station
 Bhuj railway station
 Gandhidham–Palanpur Passenger

References 

Transport in Bhuj
Intercity Express (Indian Railways) trains
Rail transport in Gujarat
Banaskantha district